Atak Ngor  is a South Sudanese film director, writer, and producer. Ngor is best known for writing and directing Atak's Film (2016) for Special Broadcasting Service (SBS) and The Foundation for Young Australians (FYA).

Ngor was born in what is now South Sudan during the Second Sudanese Civil War in 1997. After fleeing his homeland at age of 6-year-old, he resettled in Kakuma Refugee Camp in Kakuma, Kenya. In Kakuma, he then, spent a few years in the camp, before finally being granted to Australia.

Career 

In 2016, Ngor won the SBS National Youth Week Competition to write and direct a short film called Atak's Film which premiered on SBS in April, 2016. The film was produced by SBS and FYA.

Filmography

Short films 
 Atak's Film (2016) (writer, director)

Awards 
 Winner, National Youth Week (2016)

References 
 ^http://www.sbs.com.au/feature/atak SBS. April 2016.
 Atak's Film SBS On Demand sbs.com.au. 7 April 2016
 Atak Ngor atakngor.com (Official Website)

External links 
 
 SBS Movie Article sbs.com.au
 SBS News Article sbs.com.au

South Sudanese film directors
South Sudanese film producers
1997 births
Living people